Awonder Liang (born April 9, 2003) is an American chess prodigy. He is the third youngest American to qualify for the title of Grandmaster (after Abhimanyu Mishra and Samuel Sevian), at the age of 14. Liang was twice world champion in his age category.

Education
Liang attended Madison West High School. For middle school, he went to Velma Hamilton middle school. He is now attending the University of Chicago.

Career 
On April 16, 2011, when he played in the Hales Corners Challenge chess tournament in Milwaukee, Wisconsin, Liang became the youngest chess expert in United States Chess Federation (USCF) history with a rating of 2000 at the age of 8 years and 7 days. He broke the earlier record, held by Samuel Sevian, by 64 days. (That record was later broken by Abhimanyu Mishra who became expert at 7 years, 6 months, and 22 days)
 
On August 5, 2011, at the age of 8 years 118 days, he became the youngest to defeat an international master in a standard tournament game. This occurred in round 6 at the U.S. Open in Orlando, Florida, when Liang defeated IM Daniel Fernandez (rated FIDE 2401 and USCF 2448 at that time). The previous record, which was held by Fabiano Caruana, was broken by 4 months and 15 days.

On November 27, 2011, he won the gold medal in the Under 8 section of the World Youth Chess Championships in Caldas Novas, Brazil. This win earned him the titles of U-8 world chess champion and FIDE Master.

On July 29, 2012, he became the youngest player ever to defeat a grandmaster (GM) in a standard time limit tournament game. It occurred in round 3 of the Washington International in Rockville, Maryland, when he defeated GM Larry Kaufman. Liang was 9 years, 111 days old at the time, breaking the previous record by about 2.5 months. The record was previously held by Shah Hetul at the age of about 9 years, 6 months. At the same time, Liang broke the USA record for the youngest to win against a GM by 10 months, 9 days; the previous record having been held by Fabiano Caruana.

On March 23, 2013, he became the youngest person ever to obtain a master's rating within the United States Chess Federation. While playing in the Midwest Open Team Chess Festival in Dayton, Ohio, his win over a Life Master in round 2 brought his estimated USCF rating to 2206. Liang was 17 days shy of his tenth birthday at the time of this achievement, 10 days younger than the age at the previously existing record (held by Samuel Sevian, 7 days prior to his tenth birthday). On September 2, 2015, Maximillian Lu broke Liang's record by 12 days. At the 2013 World Youth Championships, which took place in Al Ain, Liang won the Under 10 section.

On June 30, 2014, at the age of 11 years and 92 days, while competing in the 2nd Annual DC International, he became the youngest American to achieve a norm for the title International Master (IM). Liang earned his third and final IM norm in Dallas on November 25, 2015 at 12 years, 7 months and 6 days old, thus becoming the youngest American ever to qualify for the title of International Master.

From July 8 to July 17, 2016, Liang participated in the U.S. Junior Closed Championship at the Chess Club and Scholastic Center of St. Louis, Missouri. Liang achieved a score of 6/9, for second place behind Jeffery Xiong, who won with a score of 6½/9. He won four games, drew four, and lost one game to Xiong.

In May 2017, Liang earned his final two Grandmaster norms in back-to-back tournaments at the Spring Chess Classic in St. Louis (Group B) and the Chicago Open, with the latter won on May 29. He won the former tournament with a score of 7½/9 and ended up getting 6½/9 at the latter tournament to share 5th to 9th place. At the time, he became the tenth youngest player ever to achieve the Grandmaster title in chess. On July 17, 2017, Liang won the US Junior Closed Championship with a score of 6½/9. This earned him a spot in the 2018 US Chess Championship.

References

External links

Awonder Liang  chess games and profile at Chess-DB.com

2003 births
Living people
Chess grandmasters
American chess players
World Youth Chess Champions
People from Madison, Wisconsin
Madison West High School alumni
American people of Chinese descent